The Myers School near Shoshone, Idaho, United States, was a lava rock schoolhouse built in the 1910s probably by sheep rancher and stonemason Bill Darrah.  It was listed on the National Register of Historic Places on September 8, 1983, when it was in deteriorated condition.

It is the only lava rock schoolhouse in the two-county area covered in a study of lava rock structures.

References

External links

School buildings completed in 1910
Buildings and structures in Lincoln County, Idaho
School buildings on the National Register of Historic Places in Idaho
National Register of Historic Places in Lincoln County, Idaho
Lava rock buildings and structures